Gejje Naada is a 1993 Indian Kannada-language romantic drama film directed by Vijay - Nanjundappa. The film cast includes Ramkumar, Shwetha and K. S. Ashwath. The film was produced under Gajamukha Creations banner and the original score and soundtrack were composed by V. Manohar.

Cast
 Ramkumar 
 Shwetha
 K. S. Ashwath 
 Pandari Bai
 Balakrishna
 Thriller Manju
 Girija Lokesh
 Sudhakar
 Venki
 Master Deepak Kumar

Soundtrack
The music of the film was composed and lyrics written by V. Manohar.

V. Manohar was awarded with the Karnataka State Film Award for Best Lyricist for the year 1993-94 for the song "Megha O Megha" written by him.

Awards
 Karnataka State Film Awards 1993-94

 Best Dialogue - Kodiganahalli Ramaiah
 Best Lyricist - V. Manohar

References

1993 films
1993 romantic drama films
1990s Kannada-language films
Indian romantic drama films
Films scored by V. Manohar